Wolfgang Wienand (born 22 February 1972) is a German manager and former world-class fencer. He competed in the individual and team foil events at the 1996 and 2000 Summer Olympics. Since 2019 he serves as Chief Executive Officer and President of Siegfried AG, a Swiss-based global chemical-pharmaceutical company.

Life and professional career
Wienand studied chemistry at the Rheinische Friedrich-Wilhelms University in Bonn and received his PhD in 2002 in organic and bioorganic chemistry at the University of Cologne, both in Germany. He also holds an Executive Master´s Degree in International Finance from HEC École des hautes études commerciales de Paris (2017). He started his professional career at the German specialty chemicals corporation Evonik Industries AG (previously Degussa AG). Since 2010 he serves as a member of the executive board of Siegfried, a Swiss-based chemical-pharmaceutical company with worldwide operations. Since 2019 Wolfgang Wienand leads the Siegfried group as Chief Executive Officer.

Sports career
As a foil fencer, Wienand was a long-standing member of the national fencing team of Germany and the German Olympic teams of Atlanta 1996 and Sydney 2000. He won the World Youth Championships in 1989 in Lisbon, finished in 4th place at the 1996 Summer Olympics in Atlanta and won the bronze medal at the 1999 World Fencing Championships in Seoul. He came 2nd in the individual competition at the European Fencing Championships 1998 in Plovdiv, where he also won the European championship with Germany's men's foil team, as well as winning the World Cup Series in 1997. Wienand was number one of the world ranking list and won seven World Cups and several German National Championships.

Since 1991 his coach was the future German national coach for men's foil, Frank-Eberhard Höltje, previously national coach for the men's junior foil team of the GDR and participant as a sabre fencer to the 1980 Summer Olympics in Moscow. Previously Wienand was coached by Manfred Kaspar, former German national coach for epee and sports director of the German national fencing association. His home club is the Olympic Fencing Club Bonn.

Wienand was a leading figure in the German national team. He finished his career in sports after the 2000 Summer Olympics to complete his PhD and to start over with his professional career in the chemical-pharmaceutical industry.

Awards
 Germany's fencer of the year 1996
 Germany's junior fencer of the year 1989

References

External links
 

1972 births
Living people
German male fencers
Olympic fencers of Germany
Fencers at the 1996 Summer Olympics
Fencers at the 2000 Summer Olympics
Sportspeople from Cologne